Beau Henry (born 17 January 1990) is an Australian professional rugby league footballer who plays for the Wentworthville Magpies in the Ron Massey Cup. He formerly played for the Newcastle Knights and Gold Coast Titans in the National Rugby League.

Background
Henry was born in Shellharbour, New South Wales, Australia.

He played his junior football for the Warilla Gorillas before being signed by the St. George Illawarra Dragons.

Playing career
From 2008 to 2010, Henry played for the St. George Illawarra Dragons' NYC team, scoring over 400 points.

In 2009, Henry almost signed with the North Queensland Cowboys but was convinced not to by Dragons first-grade coach, Wayne Bennett. He played on with the Dragons in 2010 without yet making his NRL debut.

In June 2010, Henry signed a 3-year contract with the Newcastle Knights starting in 2011.

In Round 1 of the 2011 season, Henry made his NRL debut for the Knights against the Penrith Panthers. He scored a try on debut.

After the signing of Wayne Bennett to coach the Knights in 2012, Henry was told he was unwanted for the 2012 season. He was then released mid-season in 2011 to sign a -year contract with the Gold Coast Titans starting effective immediately.

Henry made his Titans debut in Round 20 of the 2011 NRL season against the North Queensland Cowboys.

In 2014, Henry re-signed with the Titans on a 1-year contract for the rest of the season.

On 29 October 2014, Henry signed a 1-year contract to return to his original club, St. George Illawarra Dragons starting in 2015.

Henry was selected for the Dragons in the 2015 NRL Auckland Nines.

In March 2015, Henry was released from his Dragons contract to join the Wentworthville Magpies in the New South Wales Cup.

On 10 September 2018, Henry was voted Ron Massey Cup Player of the Season. On 22 September 2018, he was part of the Wentworthville side which won the Ron Massey Cup premiership, defeating St Marys 38–4.

Henry captained Wentworthville in their 2019 Ron Massey Cup grand final victory over St Mary's at Leichhardt Oval.

References

External links
Wentworthville Magpies profile
St. George Illawarra Dragons profile
NRL profile
Pacific Sports Management profile

1990 births
Australian rugby league players
Newcastle Knights players
Gold Coast Titans players
Shellharbour City Dragons players
Tweed Heads Seagulls players
Wentworthville Magpies players
Rugby league halfbacks
Rugby league five-eighths
Sportspeople from Wollongong
Living people
Rugby league players from New South Wales